James Cullen Martin (January 14, 1928 – April 20, 1999) was an American chemist. Known in the field as "J.C.", he specialized in physical organic chemistry with an emphasis on main group element chemistry.

Martin received his undergraduate and master's degree at Vanderbilt University.  His PhD work was conducted with Paul Bartlett at Harvard.  Most of his professional career was at the University of Illinois at Urbana-Champaign, where he was a colleague of Roger Adams, Speed Marvel, David Y. Curtin, Nelson J. Leonard, and Reynold C. Fuson.  Late in his career, he moved back to Vanderbilt, but soon succumbed to poor health.

Professor Martin is best known for his work on bonding of main group elements.  He is responsible for the hexafluorocumyl alcohol derived "Martin" bidentate ligand and a tridentate analog. With his doctoral student Daniel Benjamin Dess, he invented the Dess–Martin periodinane that is used for selective oxidation of alcohols. He is also known for the creation of the Martin's sulfurane.  His later work included studies of the hexaiodobenzene dication that indicated σ-delocalization ("aromaticity") between the iodine atoms.

J.C. Martin received much recognition during his career, including Senior Research Prize from the Alexander von Humboldt Foundation and a Guggenheim Fellowship. He was chair of the Organic division of the American Chemical Society.

References

Literature 

1928 births
1999 deaths
People from Dover, Tennessee
Vanderbilt University alumni
Harvard University alumni
University of Illinois Urbana-Champaign faculty
Vanderbilt University faculty
20th-century American chemists
Inorganic chemists
Organic chemists